{{DISPLAYTITLE:C13H19NO2S}}
The molecular formula C13H19NO2S (molar mass: 253.360 g/mol) may refer to:

 2C-T-15 or 2,5-dimethoxy-4-(β-cyclopropylthio)phenethylamine
 2C-T-16

Molecular formulas